The auditory pit, also known as the otic pit, is the first rudiment of the internal ear. It appears shortly after that of the eye, in the form of a patch of thickened ectoderm, the auditory plate, over the region of the hind-brain. The auditory plate becomes depressed and converted into the auditory pit (or otic pit).

References

Embryology of nervous system